Since the election of 27 April 1994, South Africa has been divided into nine provinces. They vary widely in population, from the mostly-urban Gauteng, which contains over 20% of the national population, to the mostly-desert Northern Cape, which contains less than 3%. The following table shows the provincial populations according to the 2011 National Census, the 2016 Community Survey, and the most recent mid-year population estimates by Statistics South Africa.

List

Historical data

Since the creation of the current provinces in 1994 there have been three censuses, in 1996, 2001 and 2011.

See also
 List of South African provinces by population density

References

population
South African provinces by population
provinces by population
South African provinces